"Saint Cecilia" is a single by the American rock band Foo Fighters, from their EP Saint Cecilia. It peaked at number 3 on the Billboard Mainstream Rock chart in 2016.

Background and recording
The song was first released as a track on Saint Cecilia, a free EP released by the Foo Fighters as a dedication to the victims of the November 2015 Paris Attacks. The song features background vocals by Ben Kweller. The performance was by chance, with Kweller literally passing by the hotel where the band was recording the song. The situation was outlined by Grohl in an October 2015 live performance, prior to the song's release, and then again, with the song's final release:

The song was released to rock radio, where it peaked at number 3 on the Billboard Mainstream Rock Songs In January 2016, "Saint Cecilia" became the band's twenty-second song to make to the Top 10 on the US Mainstream Rock Tracks chart, tying them with Godsmack for the most Top 10 placements on the chart since August 1995 when Foo Fighters had their first Top 10 with "This Is a Call". Similarly, it was their twenty-ninth song to reach the Alternative Songs Top 20, tying the band with the Red Hot Chili Peppers for second-most top 20 entries in the chart's history, behind U2.

Themes and composition
Pitchfork described the song as having a "robust chorus built on a progression of straight-strummed barre chords, stacked harmonies and broad lyrics that express a general sense of yearning, including lines such as "Days will come and go/No matter what I say/Nothing's set in stone/No matter what I say".

Reception and impact
Pitchfork praised the song for being "the most immediately pleasing thing they've done this decade and also the most instantly familiar" and favorably compared to past melodic singles "Learn to Fly",  "Times Like These", and "Next Year". Consequence of Sound praised the song for being different from the songs from the band's prior album, Sonic Highways, stating that it "shatters the proverbial cast and shrugs off the last few years with stony assurance and a youthful grin...Listen close enough and you’ll hear about three to four hooks going on at once. The doubled Grohl harmonies could be construed as overkill, but it’s driving too fast to sound any alarms."

Fabio Zaffagnini of "Rocking 1000", the group that had previously organized 1,000 people to sing the Foo Fighters song "Learn to Fly" in efforts to persuade the band to play a concert in Cesena, Italy, organized a second project with "Saint Cecilia".
Zaffagnini sent out a request for over 1,000 musicians to record vocals and/or instrumental parts of the song, and pieced parts of everyone's performances together into one collective piece. The project was meant to be a counterpoint to the argument that "rock music is dead".

Personnel
 Dave Grohl – lead vocals, guitar 
 Chris Shiflett – guitar
 Pat Smear – guitar
 Nate Mendel – bass 
 Taylor Hawkins – drums

Charts

Weekly charts

Year-end charts

References

2015 singles
Foo Fighters songs